Critical Assessment of PRediction of Interactions (CAPRI) is a community-wide experiment in modelling the molecular structure of protein complexes, otherwise known as protein–protein docking.

The CAPRI is an ongoing series of events in which researchers throughout the community attempt to dock the same proteins, as provided by the assessors. Rounds take place about every six months. Each round contains between one and six target protein–protein complexes whose structures have been recently determined experimentally. The coordinates and are held privately by the assessors, with the co-operation of the structural biologists who determined them. The CAPRI experiment is double-blind, in the sense that the submitters do not know the solved structure, and the assessors do not know the correspondence between a submission and the identity of its creator.

See also
Critical Assessment of Techniques for Protein Structure Prediction (CASP) — a similar exercise in the field of protein structure prediction
 Critical Assessment of Functional Annotation (CAFA)

References

External links 
 
 CAPRI or: What is the State of Protein-Protein Docking?

List of predictions servers participating in CAPRI
ClusPro
GRAMM-X
FireDock
HADDOCK  — High-Ambiguity-Driven protein–protein DOCKing
pyDockWEB — Structural prediction of protein–protein interactions
PatchDock
SmoothDock
3D-Garden — Global and Restrained Docking Exploration Nexus
SwarmDock
DOCK/PIE
SPIDER - Scoring Protein-Protein Interactions

Molecular modelling